Merakamudidam is a village in Vizianagaram district of the Indian state of Andhra Pradesh, India.

Demography
Merakamudidam mandal had a population of 56,703 in 2001, with 28,404 males and 28,299 females. The average literacy rate is 45%,with a male literacy rate is 57% and a female literacy rate of 32%.

References 

Villages in Vizianagaram district
Mandal headquarters in Vizianagaram district